"Beneath Still Waters" is a song written by Dallas Frazier in 1967 and first recorded the same year by George Jones, who released it on his 1968 album My Country. Country singer Carl Vaughn's version was released as the B-side to his single "Love Thy Neighbor" in October 1968 on Monument Records, before the release of Jones' album in December 1968.

In 1970, it was recorded and released as a single by Diana Trask.  "Beneath Still Waters" was her second hit on the country chart, spending two weeks and peaking at number 38 on the chart.

Chart performance

Emmylou Harris version
In March 1980, Emmylou Harris scored her fourth number one hit on the country chart with her version of the song, which was the second single from her album Blue Kentucky Girl.

Charts

Weekly charts

Year-end charts

References

1967 songs
1970 singles
1980 singles
George Jones songs
Emmylou Harris songs
Diana Trask songs
Songs written by Dallas Frazier
Song recordings produced by Brian Ahern (producer)
Dot Records singles
Warner Records singles